Elk Rapids Schools is a public school district in Elk Rapids, Michigan, United States. It serves parts of Antrim, Grand Traverse, and Kalkaska counties, and is part of Northwest Educational Services. The school district has two elementary schools, one middle school, one high school, and one alternative school.

Schools
 Lakeland Elementary School
 Mill Creek Elementary School
 Cherryland Middle School
 Elk Rapids High School
 Sunrise Academy (alternative school)

Additional facilities
As a member of Northwest Educational Services (formerly TBAISD), Elk Rapids students have access to Northwest Educational Services facilities. Some high school students attend the Northwest Education Services Career Tech, a career and technical education school that offers education in 23 different career fields.

References

External links
 

Education in Antrim County, Michigan
School districts in Michigan